"Gotta Man" is a song by American rapper Eve, and the third single from her debut studio album Let There Be Eve...Ruff Ryders' First Lady (1999). The song features American singer Mashonda and was produced by Swizz Beatz.

Background
Swizz Beatz originally wrote the song for an intended collaboration with singer Aaliyah. However, according to him, their schedules and labels "didn't permit it". Swizz Beatz eventually collaborated with Eve for the song, stating that it "fit the vibe" of Let There Be Eve...Ruff Ryders' First Lady.

Composition
The song features a guitar vamp, as well as "rattling drums and chiming strings" and a nursery rhyme chorus is sung by Mashonda. Eve declares her love and fidelity to a man, in a relationship that involves "bail money happily paid and secrets kept".

Charts

References

1999 singles
1999 songs
Eve (rapper) songs
Songs written by Eve (rapper)
Song recordings produced by Swizz Beatz
Songs written by Swizz Beatz
Ruff Ryders Entertainment singles
Interscope Records singles